Novomullakayevo (Yañı Mullaqay) is a rural locality (a village) and the administrative centre of Novomullakayevsky Selsoviet, Karaidelsky District, Bashkortostan, Russia. The population was 483 as of 2010. There are 6 streets.

Geography 
Novomullakayevo is located 21 km northeast of Karaidel (the district's administrative centre) by road. Mullakayevo is the nearest rural locality.

References 

Rural localities in Karaidelsky District